Eid prayers, also referred to as Salat al-Eid, are holy holiday prayers in the Islamic tradition. The literal translation of the word "Eid" in Arabic is "festival" or "feast" and is a time when Muslims congregate with family and the larger Muslim community to celebrate.

There are generally two central Eids that take place in accordance with the Islamic lunar calendar (hence the additional name Șālat al-’Īdayn ( "Prayer of the Two Eids"):

 Eid al-Fitr, also known as the "Smaller Eid" is a celebration marking the end Ramadan, the Islamic holy month of fasting, welcoming the new month of Shawwal and lasts for a period of three days. Mandatory charity, or Zakat, specifically Zakat al-Fitr (Zakat of Eid Al-Fitr) is offered to the poor by every financially-able Muslim (preferably prior to the offering of the prayer) to ensure that those who are less fortunate may also participate in the joyous holiday.
 Eid al-Adha, the "Greater Eid" or "Eid of Sacrifice", is celebration on the 10th day of Dhu al-Hijjah (last month of the Islamic lunar calendar in which the Islamic pillar of Hajj pilgrimage to Mecca is performed). This Eid follows what is considered to be the holiest day in Islam, Day of Arafah and serves as a commemoration of Ibrahim's obedience and faith when tested by Allah. Able Muslims sacrifice an animal (Qurbani) whose provisions are to be distributed between friends, family, and the poor, equally as charity. Those who are unable to offer Qurbani but meet the requirements for it may offer a donation of Zakat in its place. These obligations apply to every of-age Muslim regardless of gender, so long as they meet the requirements of giving. Its duration is 4 days.

There is no set date for the Eid holidays, as it changes from year to year. This is due to the nature of the lunar calendar that calculates months based on the phases of the moon, unlike the solar Gregorian calendar that is used most widely today. The lunar calendar is about 11 days shorter than that of the Gregorian, and so the equivalent date shifts back about 11 days every year. This is true for other holidays, such as the Chinese New Year or Rosh Hashanah, that are also based on the lunar calendar. The date normally varies in locations across the world, but many communities choose to follow the sighting reports of the crescent moon in Mecca for the sake of consistency.

Name variations

Eid greetings 
The customary greeting on the days of Eid Festivals is "Eid Mubarak", meaning "Have a Blessed Eid" and is often accompanied by other forms of cultural greetings and customs.

Location and timing 
Eid prayers are traditionally offered in an open space (such as a Musalla or Eidgah) or field available for prayer if weather permits. The technical appointed time of Salat Al-Eid, as specified by the Quran and Sunnah (sayings, teachings, and actions of Muhammad), begins when the sun reaches approximately three meters above the horizon - above the height of a spear, until it reaches its meridian - approaching its zenith. Generally speaking, it is recommended that the prayer is offered in the morning, anytime after sunrise and before noon.

The time for Eid al-Fitr prayer may be delayed while the prayer of Eid al-Adha is hastened. This is to ensure enough time to facilitate the distribution of the Zakat before the prayer or offer sacrifice after, respectively. This has been a proved Sunnah and has been well recorded in Hadith books.

Specified times of the prayer vary according to local Masjids and larger communities may offer two prayers to allow as many people as possible the chance to make the prayer.

Degree of importance 
The degree of importance of the Eid prayer vary between different Madhhab, or schools of Islamic thought. According to Hanafi scholars, Salat al-Eid is Wajib (obligatory).To Hanbali jurisprudence, it is Fard (necessary; often synonymous with Wajib) and according to Maliki and Shafiʽi schools, it is considered to be Sunnah Al-Mu'akkadah ("confirmed Sunnah, "continuously performed and never abandoned") but not mandatory.

Procedure and ritual 
In addition to the actual praying of the Salah, another component of the Eid Prayers is the delivering of a Khutbah or Islamic sermon, like that given weekly on Fridays at Jumu'ah (obligatory Friday prayers). While the sermon is delivered prior to the Salah for Jumu'ah, it is delivered after the Salah for Eid. This is in accordance with the narration by Abdullah ibn Umar that Muhammad performed Eid Prayers in this order.

The Eid prayers also take place without the customary calling of the Adhan or Iqama (arabic call to prayer), which is normally called before every Salah. This is per the traditional narration by Jabir sin Samurah, who had prayed Eid Salah behind Muhammad, and noted that the calls were not made.

Another specific characteristic of the Eid prayer is the number of Takbir, or calling of the phrase "Allahu Akbar" ("God is Great") performed in each Rakat (unit of prayer) of Salah. The Takbir for regular Salah (as well as most sunnah and special Salah) is called only once at the start with repetitions between steps of the prayer. According to Hadith narrated by 'Amr bin Shuaib over certified generations, Muhammad completed 7 takbirs in the first rakah of the Eid prayer and 5 in the second, then began with the recitation of the Quran. The Hanafis complete 3 takbirs before reciting Quran in the first rak'ah and 3 takbirs after reciting Quran before prostrating.

Additional sunnah 
To reap further rewards from praying the Eid, there are additional recommended steps that Muhammad did in his time according to his Sunnah that Muslims may perform. These include bathing or Ghusl prior to attending the festival, dressing in your best clothes, eating before the Eid al-Fitr prayer and waiting until after Eid al-Adha prayer to eat, saying the Takbir to and from the place of Eid and after every prayer for the remaining days of the festival, as well as taking an alternative route home from the one taken to the prayer.

Women and the Eid Salah 
Eid festivals are meant to be an event for all members of the Muslim community, including women and children. According to the Hadith narrated by the Nusaybah Bint Al-Harith (Umm 'Atiyah), women, young and old, were called to come out and participate in the joy of Eid and reap its blessings.

See also

References

Salah
Eid (Islam)
Salah terminology